The Ajax Motors Co. of Seattle, Washington, was an automobile company started by George, Frank, and Charles Parker. The company the three men started produced a car available in three different wheelbase lengths and could be had in either right hand or left hand steering. It sported a 6-cylinder engine that was available in either sleeve-valve or conventional poppet form, and could be changed "from one to the other at comparatively little expense."

Overview 
This is an old-fashioned model car from the 1900s. The description of this car is 4 wheels, only 2 seats, elegant model, also the lights are unique in this model. Things to know Ajax is located in the Netherlands. These cars are now exclusive and rare to find because they are antique (not made anymore).

Similar Car, 1915-1922 Sutz BearCat "In some ways, the 1915-1922 Stutz Bearcat was a labor of love. By the time Harry C. Stutz got around to the Bearcat, the car for which he is best remembered, he had been designing and building automobiles for at least six years.

History 
The History of cars during the 1900s generation, Contributions to the manufacture of early 1900s cars were made possible by several men. Two brothers, Charles E. and James F Duryea, were the first to manufacture and market a successful gasoline-powered automobile.

Beginning in the 1770s, many people tried to make cars that would run on steam. Some early steam cars worked well, and some did not. Some were fire pumpers that moved by themselves, and others were small locomotives with road wheels. Beginning in the 1880s, inventors tried very hard to make cars that would run well enough to use every day. These experimental cars ran on steam, gasoline, or electricity. By the 1890s, Europeans were buying and driving cars made by Benz, Daimler, Panhard, and others, and Americans were buying and driving cars made by Duryea, Haynes, Winton, and others.

In 1900 wealthy people bought cars for pleasure, comfort, and status. Many doctors bought small, affordable cars because they were more dependable than horses and easier to keep ready. Rural Americans liked cars because they could cover long distances without depending on trains.

Early 1900s cars

Contributions to the manufacture of early 1900s cars were made possible by several men. Two brothers, Charles E. and James F Duryea, were the first to manufacture and market a successful gasoline-powered automobile.

The sudden rush of fame allowed the brothers to form the Duryea Motor Wagon Company and produce early 1900s cars. Orders began arriving soon and unofficially, the American automobile industry was born as the brothers manufactured the first of 13 vehicles in 1896.

5 Facts about Classic cars

 The first full-scale, self-propelled mechanical vehicle was released in 1769. It was a steam-powered tricycle that was used to haul cannons around town. (But, it weighed 8,000 pounds!)
 The Benz Patent-Motorwagen is believed to be the first modern automobile. German inventor Carl Benz applied for the patent in 1886, and later, his wife took it on the first-ever, long-distance drive.
 In 1913, the Ford Model T became the first mass-produced automobile. Three years later, 55 percent of all cars in the world were Model Ts, which is a record yet to be broken.
 The 1964 Pontiac GTO is widely regarded as the first “muscle car.” Pontiac owned the muscle scene in the early 1960s, but by 1968, that car had plenty of competition.
 The Ford Mustang also made its debut in 1964. It was officially unveiled at the World’s Fair in Flushing Meadows, New York. That same day, the car also debuted in showrooms across America, and close to 22,000 Mustangs were purchased.

Technology 
The world has revolutionized that technology is spectacular automobiles. For instance, "Self-driving cars are no longer science-fiction; they are just around the corner of becoming mainstream. The idea is that vehicles will be completely autonomous without any need for human intervention or manual navigation. However, as with any new technology especially one involving the transportation of human beings from point A to point B, there are inherent dangers involved."

Most cars run on gasoline because "the gasoline engine has been reliable, practical, and fairly efficient since about 1900. It is easier to control than a steam engine and less likely to burn or explode."

See also
Brass Era car

References

 Georgano, G.N., "Ajax", in G.N. Georgano, ed., The Complete Encyclopedia of Motorcars 1885-1968  (New York: E.P. Dutton and Co., 1974), pp. 30.

Defunct motor vehicle manufacturers of the United States
Defunct companies based in Seattle
Defunct manufacturing companies based in Washington (state)